Municipality of Cosalá is a municipality in Sinaloa in northwestern Mexico.

Political subdivision
Cosalá Municipality is subdivided in 5 sindicaturas:
Cosalá
Guadalupe de los Reyes
La Ilama
San José de las Bocas
Santa Cruz de Alaya

References

Municipalities of Sinaloa